The 2018 SMC-PSA Annual Awards was an annual ceremony recognized the athletes, teams, executives and personalities in the past year 2017. The awards is organized by the Philippine Sportswriters Association, a Philippine-based media organization composed of sports writers and reporters, section editors and columnists from print (broadsheet and tabloids) and online media. PSA is headed by Eduardo "Dodo" Catacutan of Sports Interactive Network Philippines.

The awards night, with the theme "A Night of Greatness", was held on February 27, 2018 at the Maynila Hall of the Manila Hotel in Ermita, Manila. The awards night is mainly sponsored by San Miguel Corporation, Milo, Philippine Sports Commission, Cignal and Tapa King.

Cue artist Carlo Biado, bowler Krizziah Lyn Tabora and boxer Jerwin Ancajas were awarded as the co-Athletes of the Year. PSC Chairman Butch Ramirez and Philippine Olympic Committee (POC) President Ricky Vargas attended the occasion.

Secretary of Agriculture and former sports columnist Manny Piñol was served as the guest speaker representing Philippine President Rodrigo Duterte.

Honor roll

Main awards
The following are the list of main awards of the event.

Major awardees
These are the major awardees of the event. Sorted in alphabetical order.

Special citations
The citations were given to the gold medalists of the Southeast Asian Games and the ASEAN Para Games both held in Kuala Lumpur, Malaysia in the period of August 19 to 30 and September 17 to 23, 2017.

 2017 Southeast Asian Games gold medalists

 2017 ASEAN Para Games gold medalists

Minor citations

Milo Junior Athletes of the Year

Tony Siddayao Awards for Under-17 Athletes

See also
2017 in Philippine sports

References

PSA
PSA